Kuwakonda is a tehsil and the development block headquarters of  Dantewada district, Bastar Division, of Chhattisgarh.  Kuwakonda is located on the Dantewada–Hyderabad Road, 24 km from the district headquarters in the town of Dantewada.

Waterfall
On Kuwakonda block having one waterfall name is Fulpad Waterfall. Height of waterfall is 225 feet. This is the highest waterfall on Dantewada District.

Administrative divisions
Kuwakonda Tehsil is divided into twenty-six gram panchayats, each one of which has jurisdiction over one or more villages.

Notes

Cities and towns in Dantewada district
Tehsils of Chhattisgarh